The Erenhot–Guangzhou Expressway, designated as G55 and commonly referred to as the Erguang Expressway is an expressway that connects the cities of Erenhot, Inner Mongolia, and Guangzhou, Guangdong. When fully complete, it will be  in length.

Route

Inner Mongolia
Erenhot, the northern terminus of the expressway, is a border town with Mongolia and has a border checkpoint. 
The expressway is under construction from Erenhot to Baiyinchagan in Ulanqab, and complete from Baiyinchagan to the Shanxi border.

Shanxi
The entire portion of the expressway in Shanxi is complete.

Henan
The entire portion of the expressway in Henan is complete.

Hubei

In 2000, a cache of Warring States period artifacts was discovered in eastern Wulipu's Zuozhong village during the construction of the Xiang(yang)–Jing(zhou) Highway.

Hunan
The entire portion of the expressway in Hunan is under construction. This section has been beset by delays and cost overruns.

Guangdong
The expressway is under construction from the Hunan border to Huaiji County, Zhaoqing, and complete from Huaiji County to the southern terminus, Guangzhou.

References

Chinese national-level expressways
Expressways in Inner Mongolia
Expressways in Shanxi
Expressways in Henan
Expressways in Hubei
Expressways in Hunan
Expressways in Guangdong